Walking Happy is a musical with music by Jimmy Van Heusen, lyrics by Sammy Cahn and book by Roger O. Hirson and Ketti Frings. The story is based on the 1916 play Hobson's Choice by Harold Brighouse. The musical was nominated for six Tony Awards, including Best Musical.

The title song "Walking Happy" was originally meant to be used in the 1963 film Papa's Delicate Condition, with Jackie Gleason singing it, but it was dropped before the film's release.

Production history
The production opened on Broadway at the Lunt-Fontanne Theatre on November 26, 1966 and ran for 161 performances. Directed by Cy Feuer with choreography by Danny Daniels, the cast included George Rose as Henry Hobson, Norman Wisdom as Will Mossop, Louise Troy as Maggie Hobson, and Ed Bakey as George Beenstock. Conductor Herbert Grossman served as Music Director. 

The original cast recording was released by Angel Records in 1966.

Plot synopsis
In Lancashire, England in 1880 the men of the town gather in the local pub, with much drinking. The widower Henry Hobson, owner of a boot shop, has three daughters, and he wishes them to marry. The local leader of the temperance league, George Beenstock, has two sons. The two younger Hobson daughters flirt with the Beenstock sons, while Hobson tells his eldest daughter Maggie that her time has passed. Maggie decides to make a match with Will, a skilled shoemaker, even though Will is engaged to another. Will and Maggie establish their own boot shop. Meanwhile, Hobson's drinking continues, his young daughters try to take Maggie's place at his shop, and Will and Maggie marry. Hobson and Beenstock settle on a dowry for the young ladies. Hobson realizes that he needs Maggie and Will, and they become partners.

Songs

 Act 1
 "Think of Something Else"
 "Where Was I"
 "How D'ya Talk to a Girl"
 "Clog and Grog"
 "If I Be Your Best Chance"
 "A Joyful Thing"
 "What Makes It Happen"
 "Use Your Noggin'"

 Act 2
 "You're Right, You're Right"
 "I'll Make a Man of the Man"
 "Walking Happy"
 "I Don't Think I'm In Love"
 "Such a Sociable Sort"
 "It Might As Well Be Her"
 "People Who Are Nice"
 "You're Right, You're Right" (reprise)
 "I Don't Think I'm In Love" (reprise)

Critical response
Walter Kerr reviewed the musical for the New York Times. He wrote that the musical was "easygoing, unpretentious, minor-league...a light, slight, occasionally charming pastime." The "principal asset" is Norman Wisdom, a "zany original".

Awards and nominations

Original Broadway production

References

External links
 
  Production information and plot at guidetomusicaltheatre.com
musicalheaven

1966 musicals
Broadway musicals
Musicals based on plays
Plays by Roger O. Hirson
Plays set in England
Works by Ketti Frings
Fiction set in 1880